Balázs Borbély (born 2 October 1979) is a former professional footballer. His former clubs were TJ Družstevník Vrakúň, FC ŠTK 1914 Šamorín and AEL Limassol. At international level, he represented  Slovakia.

Club career
An ethnic Hungarian, Borbély was born in Czechoslovakia and began playing football for his home town club FK DAC 1904 Dunajská Streda until joining Artmedia Petržalka, the club where he would enjoy his greatest success. He captained the Artmedia Petržalka side which reached the group stages of the 2005–06 UEFA Champions League. Following this success, he moved to German Bundesliga side 1. FC Kaiserslautern, where he would spend one and a half seasons. He struggled through injury in his tenure at Kaiserslautern and returned to Artmedia Petržalka in the summer of 2007.

He moved abroad again when Romanian club FC Timişoara acquired Borbély to help strengthen their defensive midfield in January 2008. He would help Timișoara reach the play-off round of the 2009–10 UEFA Champions League where the club fell to German side VfB Stuttgart.

International career
Borbély has made 15 appearances for the Slovakia national team, including playing in the UEFA Euro 2008 qualification rounds.

Honours

Player
Artmedia Petržalka
Slovakian League: 2004-05, 2007-08
Slovakian Cup: 2003-04, 2007-08
Slovak Super Cup: 2005

Manager
MFK Petržalka
3. Liga: Winners 2017-18

References

External links

Living people
1979 births
Sportspeople from Dunajská Streda
Hungarians in Slovakia
Association football midfielders
Slovak footballers
Slovak expatriate footballers
FC DAC 1904 Dunajská Streda players
FC Petržalka players
1. FC Kaiserslautern players
FC Politehnica Timișoara players
AEL Limassol players
FC ŠTK 1914 Šamorín players
Slovakia international footballers
Expatriate footballers in Germany
Slovak expatriate sportspeople in Germany
Expatriate footballers in Cyprus
Expatriate footballers in Romania
Slovak Super Liga players
Liga I players
Bundesliga players
2. Bundesliga players
Cypriot First Division players